The Nangatadjara are an Aboriginal Australian people of Western Australia.

Country
Their north-northeastern extension touched the Bailey, Virginia and Newland Ranges. They roamed eastwards of Lake Carey and Burtville and around the Jubilee and Plumridge lake areas, and they were present around Lake Yeo, Rason and the Bartlett Soak.

History of contact
The Nangatadjara are known to have shifted west to Burtville and Laverton in the last decade of the 19th century.

Alternative names
 Nanggatha.
 Nangandjara, Nganandjara.
 Nangata.
 Wangata.
 Dituwonga.
 Ditu.
 Ngalapita.
 Njingipalaru. (Waljen exonym signifying "different talk ")
 Alindjara. ('east'(ern people))

Notes

Citations

Sources

Aboriginal peoples of Western Australia
Goldfields-Esperance